Vittorio Negri (October 16, 1923 - April 9, 1998) was an Italian conductor, record producer, and musicologist.

Negri was born in Milan. He initially studied at the Milan Conservatory, then at the Salzburg Mozarteum, where he became assistant conductor under Bernhard Paumgartner in 1952. He initially worked on critical editions for I Musici, but took a position with Philips in the late 1950s as a record producer. He became a prolific producer for Philips's classical music department and recorded copiously for them as conductor of the Berlin Chamber Orchestra and the Dresden Staatskapelle. He devoted much of his recording energies to Vivaldi, while continuing to work on musicological projects; he surfaced a lost work of Cimarosa's, the Requiem in G Minor, and subsequently performed and recorded it. In the 1980s he led a chamber orchestra in Perugia, having primarily given up producing. He was the founder of the Italian Society of Musicology.

Negri was nominated for two Grammy Awards in 1969, one in 1972, and one in 1980.

References

External links
Interview with Vittorio Negri, August 27, 1992

Italian record producers
1923 births
1998 deaths
20th-century Italian musicologists
20th-century Italian composers
20th-century Italian conductors (music)
20th-century Italian male musicians
Italian male conductors (music)
Italian expatriates in Austria